Pietro Palagario, O.F.M. (died 1505) was a Roman Catholic prelate who served as Bishop of Telese (1487–1505) and Bishop of Lavello (1482–1487).

Biography
Pietro Palagario was ordained a priest in the Order of Friars Minor.
On 21 June 1482, he was appointed during the papacy of Pope Sixtus IV as Bishop of Lavello.
On 12 February 1487, he was appointed during the papacy of Pope Innocent VIII as Bishop of Telese.
He served as Bishop of Telese o Cerreto Sannita  until his death in 1505.

References

External links and additional sources
 (Chronology of Bishops) 
 (Chronology of Bishops) 
 (Chronology of Bishops) 
 (Chronology of Bishops) 

15th-century Italian Roman Catholic bishops
16th-century Italian Roman Catholic bishops
Bishops appointed by Pope Sixtus IV
Bishops appointed by Pope Innocent VIII
1505 deaths
Franciscan bishops